Shiyaling station  is a station on Line 14 of Shenzhen Metro in Shenzhen, Guangdong, China, which is opened on 28 October 2022. It is located at northeast of the intersection of Shengbao Road, Kejieyuan Road and Bulan Road.

It will become an interchange station for Line 14 and Line 17 in the future. Line 17 platforms is reserved during the construction of Line 14.

Station layout

Exits
Note: Some exits are reserved for Line 17 (Exit C - Exit G).

References

External links
 Shenzhen Metro Shiyaling Station (Chinese)
 Shenzhen Metro Shiyaling Station (English)

Railway stations in Guangdong
Shenzhen Metro stations
Longgang District, Shenzhen
Railway stations in China opened in 2022